Jafarov (masculine, "(son) of Cəfər") and Jafarova (feminine) is an Azerbaijani surname. Its russified form is Dzhafarov.

It may refer to:

Jafarov
Aghashirin Jafarov (1906–1984), Azerbaijani Red Army starshina
Asaf Jafarov (1927–2000), Azerbaijani landscape painter
Elnur Jafarov (born 1997), Azerbaijani footballer 
Galib Jafarov (born 1978), Kazakh boxer of Azerbaijani descent
Kamal Jafarov
Kanan Jafarov
Mammad Yusif Jafarov (1885–1938), Azerbaijani statesman
Rasul Jafarov (born 1984), Azerbaijani lawyer and prominent human rights defender
Rza Jafarov
Saidjamshid Jafarov
Vagif Jafarov (1949–1991), Azerbaijani politician
Zaur Jafarov

Jafarova
Matanat Jafarova (born 1986), Azerbaijani former footballer
Nazrin Jafarova (born 1997), Azerbaijani tennis player
Sevda Jafarova (born 1965), Azerbaijani pediatrician, reanimatologist and neonatologist

See also
Cəfərli (disambiguation)
Ja'far
Al-Ja'fari

Azerbaijani-language surnames
Patronymic surnames